The Derby dell'Appennino is a derby between Bologna F.C. 1909 and ACF Fiorentina, two football clubs in Italy. Derby dell'Appennino gets its name from the Appennino Tosco-Emiliano mountains of the Apennine Mountains which geographically separate the two cities.

Statistics

Cup matches

Head-to-head ranking in Serie A (1930–2022)

• Total: Fiorentina with 42 higher finishes,  Bologna with 28 higher finishes (as of the end of the 2021–22 season).

Notes:
 Both teams didn't qualify for the final round of 8 teams in 1946

References

Appennino
Sport in Tuscany
ACF Fiorentina
Bologna F.C. 1909